When the Battle of the Alamo ended at approximately 6:30 a.m. on March 6, 1836, fewer than fifty of the almost 250 Texians who had occupied the Alamo Mission in San Antonio, Texas, were alive. The conflict, a part of the Texas Revolution, was the first step in Mexican President Antonio López de Santa Anna's attempt to retake the province of Texas after an insurgent army of Texian settlers, native "Tejanos", and adventurers from the United States had driven out all Mexican troops the previous year.

Santa Anna led an army to San Antonio de Bexar, arriving on February 23, 1836, and immediately initiating a siege of the Alamo, which housed Texian Army troops. As the Mexican Army had approached San Antonio, several of the Alamo defenders brought their families into the Alamo to keep them safe. During the twelve days of the siege, Alamo co-commander William Barret Travis sent multiple couriers to the acting Texas government, the remaining Texas army under James Fannin, and various Texas communities, asking for reinforcements, provisions, and ammunition.

The siege culminated in an early-morning assault by Mexican troops which left almost all of the defenders dead. Some reports claimed that several Texians surrendered but were quickly executed on Santa Anna's orders. Of the Texians who fought during the battle, only two survived: Travis's slave, Joe, was assumed by the Mexican soldiers to be a noncombatant, and Brigido Guerrero, who had deserted from the Mexican Army several months before, convinced the Mexican soldiers that he had been taken prisoner by the Texians. Alamo co-commander James Bowie's freedman, Sam, was also spared, although it is not known if he participated in the fighting.

During the battle, most of the women and children had gathered in the sacristy of the church. As Mexican soldiers entered the room, a boy, thought to be the son of defender Anthony Wolf, stood up to rearrange a blanket around his shoulders. Mistaking him for a Texian soldier, the Mexican soldiers bayoneted him. In the confusion, at least one of the women was lightly wounded. Bowie's family, including Gertrudis Navarro, Juana Navarro Alsbury and her son, were hiding in one of the rooms along the west wall. Navarro opened the door to their room to signal that they meant no harm. A Mexican officer soon arrived and led the women to a spot along one of the walls where they would be relatively safe. All of the women and children were eventually placed under the protection of an officer and escorted out of the Alamo and imprisoned in the home of the Musquiz family.

On March 7, Santa Anna interviewed each of the survivors individually. He was impressed with Susanna Dickinson, the young widow of Alamo artillery captain Almaron Dickinson, and offered to adopt her infant daughter Angelina Dickinson and have the child educated in Mexico City. Susanna Dickinson refused the offer, which was not extended to Juana Navarro Alsbury for her son who was of similar age.

Santa Anna ordered that the Tejano civilian survivors be allowed to return to their homes in San Antonio. Dickinson and Joe were allowed to travel towards the Anglo settlements, escorted by Ben, a former slave from the United States who served as Mexican Colonel Juan Almonte's cook. Each woman was given $2 and a blanket and was allowed to go free and spread the news of the destruction that awaited those who opposed the Mexican government. Before releasing Joe, Santa Anna ordered that the surviving members of the Mexican Army parade in a grand review, in the hopes that Joe and Dickinson would deliver a warning to the remainder of the Texian forces that his army was unbeatable.

When the small party of survivors arrived in Gonzales on March 13 they found Sam Houston, the commander of all Texian forces, waiting there with about 400 men. After Dickinson and Joe related the details of the battle and the strength of Santa Anna's army, Houston advised all civilians to evacuate and then ordered the army to retreat. This was the beginning of the Runaway Scrape, in which much of the population of Texas, including the acting government, rushed to the East to escape the advancing Mexican Army.

List of survivors

See also
 List of Alamo defenders

Notes

Footnotes

References

See also

United States history-related lists
Texas Revolution
Lists of people from Texas
Lists of survivors
 
Texian survivors of the Battle of the Alamo